The British Columbia Ambulance Service (BCAS) is an ambulance service that provides emergency medical response for the province of British Columbia, Canada. BCAS is one of the largest providers of emergency medical services in North America. The fleet consists of more than 500 ground ambulances operating from 183 stations across the province along with 80 support vehicles. Additionally, BCAS provides inter-facility patient transfer services in circumstances where a patient needs to be moved between health care facilities for treatment. BCAS also operates a medical evacuation program that utilizes both fixed-wing and rotary aircraft.

History

Prior to 1974, ambulance services in British Columbia was provided by a mixture of volunteer ambulance brigades, fire departments, funeral homes, and private operators. As a result of recommendations made by the Foulkes Commission's report on health care, titled "Health Security for British Columbians" released in 1973, the Government of British Columbia created the Emergency Health Services Commission (EHSC), which in turn created the BC Ambulance Service on July 4, 1974.

Organization
BCAS is managed by British Columbia Emergency Health Services (BCEHS), which is under the jurisdiction of the Provincial Health Services Authority (PHSA). The operating budget for BCEHS in 2020 was $560 million.  Prior to 2013, BCAS was a bona fide Public Safety Agency, but with the move to BCEHS became a health care agency, resulting in significant operational, regulatory and practical changes that significantly impacted its functionality.

There are 183 ambulance stations in British Columbia, including the transfer fleet. As of 2018, the BCAS employs 4,750 part-time and full-time paramedics and dispatchers. This includes management and administrative employees in the BCAS. Dispatch centres are located in Kamloops, Vancouver, and Victoria.

The Emergency Medical Assistants Licensing Board is an independent regulatory body responsible for licensing paramedics.

Air ambulance fleet

BCEHS's air ambulance program consists of a fleet of ten fixed-wing aircraft with three each in Vancouver and Kelowna, two in Prince George, and one each in Nanaimo and Fort St. John. Additional aircraft are chartered on an as-needed basis. In addition to its planes, BCEHS operates six dedicated air ambulance helicopters, two based in Vancouver, one in Nanaimo, one in Kamloops, one in Prince George, and one in Prince Rupert. BCEHS also utilizes approximately 35 pre-qualified charter carriers throughout British Columbia. Helijet, an airline based in Richmond, B.C., provides helicopters, pilots, and maintenance crews to their Sikorsky S76 helicopters contracted by BCEHS in Vancouver and Prince Rupert. Helijet has been servicing BCEHS since 1988, expanding to Prince Rupert in 2011. The Sikorsky air ambulances can carry up to 2 stretchers and 4 medical attendants and can travel a maximum distance of 200 miles (320 km), serving a 100 mile radius from their base.

Licensing and qualifications
Paramedics qualified in British Columbia are broadly grouped as emergency medical assistants (EMAs) and are licensed by the Emergency Medical Assistants Licensing Board (EMALB), an independent government regulatory agency, under one of six categories:

 First responder (EMA-FR)
Emergency medical responder (EMR)
Primary care paramedic (PCP)
Advanced care paramedic (ACP)
Critical care paramedic (CCP)
Infant Transport Team (ITT)
To be hired by BC Ambulance, you must be at minimum a licensed Emergency Medical Responder (EMR).

Paramedics from other provinces and countries who request to be licensed in British Columbia will need to apply to the EMALB for equivalency.

All paramedics employed by BC Ambulance are required to obtain a Class 4 driver's licence.

Clinical practice
Paramedics in BC do not work under the license of a physician as they do in other provinces/jurisdictions. They hold their own licenses under the authority of the EMALB. Paramedic practitioners practising in BC do not use protocols, instead, they utilize BCEHS Treatment Guidelines (TGs). TGs are the medical resource documents that guide paramedic practice in the province of BC. TGs are a combination of best practice and evidence-based medicine designed to better equip paramedics to make informed decisions in the field. They provide valuable information regarding what you should do for your patients under certain circumstances but the decision of when, and if, that care is appropriate is dependent on your ability to decide the best course of action for the patient.

Many paramedics seek additional training to achieve licence endorsements, which authorize them to perform medical interventions/treatments outside of their normal scope of practice. The two most common licence endorsements are for EMRs to utilize narcotic antagonists (otherwise known as Narcan or Naloxone) and a licence level referred to as PCP-IV, which authorizes Primary Care Paramedics to initiate and maintain an IV as well as administer certain medications and crystalloid fluids through an IV line.

Selected PCPs and ACPs are able to administer NA-1 (if endorsed and authorized) after consultation with a transport advisor as part of the FRONTIER stroke trial. If successful, this trial will change stroke management and highlight the essential role of prehospital care in stroke management.

Selected ACPs are able to administer TNKase (if endorsed and authorized) after consultation with a transport advisor as part of the Collaborative Heart Attack Management Program (CHAMP) Protocol for ST-Elevation Myocardial Infarction Pre-hospital Reperfusion. If this trial is successful, it can be extended to other areas of the province.

Paramedics have the ability to initiate critical patient bypasses to specialized centres with certain patient presentations and initiate alternate transport destinations to alleviate pressures and patient transport to emergency departments. Some of these include:

 Stroke bypass
 STEMI bypass
 Palliative care (ASTAR Clinical Pathway)
 Influenza like illness (ILI Clinical Pathway)
 Major trauma bypass
 Pediatric and obstetrics bypass 
 Sobering centres/detox

First responder 
First responders are licensed emergency medical assistants in British Columbia, however, they are not employed by BCAS. Most first responders work as firefighters or as event medics for festivals or sporting events. EMA FR courses take 5 days to complete, and students are trained in scene assessment, basic patient assessments, basic wound & traumatic injury care, fracture management, basic airway management, and cardiopulmonary resuscitation. First responders can receive licence endorsements for oral airways, ventilation, suction, and BVM, spinal immobilization, oral glucose treatment, emergency childbirth, and AED.

Emergency medical responder
Emergency medical responders (EMRs) are licensed to administer basic life-saving emergency medical care. EMR is the lowest level of care employed by BCAS and most EMRs work at rural ambulance stations on part-time shifts. Further training is required (e.g. primary care paramedic) before transferring to a BCAS station in a larger population centre.

EMR courses take 2–3 weeks to complete and students will receive a course certificate upon completion. EMRs are licensed to provide spinal immobilization, patient handling, packaging, and transporting, blood pressure measurements, glucometer usage, emergency fracture immobilization, soft tissue injury treatment, administration of automatic or semi-automatic external defibrillator, and airway management, as well as all skills and services under the first responder licence and its endorsements. EMR endorsements include IV maintenance, pulse oximetry, medication administration of Narcan, nitroglycerin, analgesics, and aspirin, chest auscultation, insertion and maintenance of nasal airway, and the use and interpretation of a glucometer.

Primary care paramedic

Primary care paramedics (PCPs) are licensed to administer more advanced care. PCP is the most common level of care in BCAS. Primary care paramedic programs take between 9 weeks and 8 months to complete and issue program certificates. Unlike EMA FR or EMR education, PCP programs consist of multiple courses in each program and most programs are offered full time or at night. In addition to all services provided by EMRs, PCPs are licensed to administer extraglottic airway devices, medication administration through IV, oral (PO), subcutaneous, sublingual, intramuscular, inhalation, and nebulization routes. PCPs can receive endorsements for IV initiation, administration of IV crystalloids, endotracheal tube intubation, ECG acquisition, administration of non-invasive positive airway pressure ventilation devices, and administration of anti-emetics, anti-nauseants, and vitamins through IV, oral, SL, SC, inhalation, or nebulization routes.

All newly hired PCPs are classified as part-time employees who work standby and on-call shifts. Part-time PCPs receive 2$/hour for on-call shifts and minimum wage for standby shifts until they are called to respond, at which point they receive their full wage. This method of ambulance deployment makes up 75% of BC's pre-hospital care. A new Scheduled On-Call staffing model aims to address rural and remote part-time staffing by 2022, but it has been met with mixed reviews.

Part-time and full-time PCP positions are considered separate internal job postings and are filled according to seniority. Selection for full-time PCP positions is determined by total full-time seniority and then, if there are no more full-time PCP applicants, total part-time seniority. Stations in Vancouver typically have the lowest entry threshold for full-time PCP positions. While this has traditionally meant working for in smaller towns to accumulate at least five years of part-time seniority, the required part-time seniority for accepting a full-time spot in Vancouver is currently approaching zero months (08/2022).

Community paramedic

Community paramedics (CPs) provide non-emergency and scheduled care to patients, often referred to colloquially as "clients," (although CP services are covered by provincial health insurance and come at little to no cost), as part of an integrated healthcare team, usually coordinated with a regional health authority or hospital. Community paramedic classification is neither a licence nor a certification received from an external educational institution. Unlike previously mentioned levels of care, CPs are certified internally, and the services they provide are consistent with their pre-existing licence level. CPs are trained in community outreach and awareness, prevention care services for elderly patients, fall prevention assessments, scheduled and unscheduled home visits, and community public health promotion and education.

Advanced care paramedic

Advanced care paramedics (ACPs) are trained to handle more complex cases, including serious trauma and cardiac resuscitation. ACPs work in large population centres such as Vancouver, Victoria, Nanaimo, Kamloops, Kelowna, and Prince George.

Infant Transport Team

The Infant Transport Team (ITT) are specialized critical care paramedics who are specifically trained in management of perinatal, neonatal and pediatric patients. Formerly, they were primary care paramedics (with many ACP Schedule 2 endorsements) with advanced training to provide emergency medical care to pediatric, neo-natal and high-risk obstetric patients. ITT paramedics work in close collaboration with practitioners at BC Children's & Women's Hospital in Vancouver. The team functions as an extension of the neonatal/pediatric intensive care unit as well as the high risk labour and delivery areas of the hospital. Tertiary level critical care is delivered by the team to the bedside at any location in the province.

They respond as an equally qualified team of two and sometimes take a physician with them for critically ill patients. When dispatched on street calls, these are targeted response ambulances that often assist or intervene when necessary, but can hand a more stable patient off to a layered or co-responding PCP ambulance. The team currently consists of only 25 specially trained paramedics for the entire province.

Critical care paramedic
Critical care paramedics (CCPs) provide the most sophisticated care, including transporting patients by air and ground. CCPs specialize in the transport of complex critically injured or ill patients to specialized centres.

Paramedic specialist

Paramedic specialists are licensed advanced care and critical care paramedics who are trained to handle disasters and mass casualty events.

BC Ambulance has clinical consultation available for paramedics where paramedic specialists are enabled and empowered by the organization and by the medical directors to provide clinical, safety, and operational advice to paramedics. The pre-hospital environment poses many clinical challenges to practising paramedics. When faced with these challenges it may be appropriate to seek clarity with an appropriate senior clinician. Paramedics at all license levels can call CliniCall to speak with a paramedic specialist who will be either an ACP or a CCP.

Wages and benefits
Wages are paid according to license qualification, years of service and supervisory status. Additional service pay is gained at 10, 15, 20, and 25 years of service.

See also
E-Comm, 9-1-1 call and dispatch centre for Southwestern BC
List of EMS Services in Ontario
HealthLink BC

References

External links
 
 Ambulance Paramedics of BC, CUPE Local 873 Official Site
British Columbia Paramedic Association 
BCAS 10-7 Association Society

Government agencies established in 1974
British Columbia government departments and agencies
Ambulance services in Canada
Medical and health organizations based in British Columbia
Emergency medical services in Canada